Kerry-Lynne D. Findlay  (born 12 January 1955) is a Canadian politician, who was elected as the MP for South Surrey—White Rock in the 2019 federal election. She previously sat in the House of Commons of Canada from the 2011 election until 2015. She represented the electoral district of Delta—Richmond East as a member of the Conservative Party. She was appointed and sworn in as Parliamentary Secretary to the Minister of Justice on June 1, 2011, and as Associate Minister of National Defence on February 22, 2013.  She served as the Minister of National Revenue from July 15, 2013, until November 4, 2015.

Education
Findlay graduated from the University of British Columbia in 1975 with a Bachelor of Arts in history and political science. She then graduated from the same university in 1978 with a law degree.

Legal career

During her legal career, Findlay has been active in both the national and B.C. provincial branch of the Canadian Bar Association holding various positions in that organization including national and provincial chair of the Constitutional Law Section, member of the National Task Force on Court Reform in Canada, and elected president of the B.C. Branch for the 1997–1998 term.  Findlay was appointed a Queen's Counsel in March 1999 by the Attorney-General of B.C. and served a five-year term as a Member of the Canadian Human Rights Tribunal by appointment of the Federal Minister of Justice (2006–2011). She has also been recognized with the Vancouver YWCA Woman of Distinction Award in the category of Management, Professions and Trades (May 2001) and the national Cecilia I. Johnstone Award (2011) that recognizes women who have achieved professional excellence in their field and influenced other women to pursue legal careers, supported other women in career advancement or opened doors for women lawyers in a variety of job settings that historically were closed to them.

Political career

Findlay sat on a selection panel to help choose a replacement for Marie Deschamps of Quebec, who retired from the bench.

She was defeated by Liberal candidate Carla Qualtrough in the 2015 election.

In 2017, Findlay announced her candidacy as the Conservative Party of Canada candidate in the South Surrey—White Rock by-election. Findlay was defeated by Gordie Hogg, taking 42.1% of the vote to Hogg's 47.5%.
In 2019, Findlay ran again for Member of Parliament of South Surrey—White Rock as the Conservative Party candidate. Findlay won in the riding at that year's federal election with 42.6% of the vote, unseating Gordie Hogg who entered Parliament through a by-election.

Findlay voted in support of Bill C-233 - an act to amend the Criminal Code (sex-selective abortion), which would make it an indictable or a summary offence for a medical practitioner to knowingly perform an abortion solely on the grounds of the child's genetic sex.

In August 2020, she received backlash after she retweeted another user's Twitter post trying to connect Chrystia Freeland with George Soros. She deleted the tweet and apologized shortly after.

On September 13, 2022 Findlay was named Chief Opposition Whip by Conservative Party Leader Pierre Poilievre. She is the first woman in this role from the Conservative Party of Canada, which she currently holds.

Community
Findlay's volunteer posts, in addition to the Canadian Bar Association, have included chair of the Vancouver City Planning Commission, board member of Science World, executive member of the Junior Leagues of Canada, president of Delta Zeta chapter of Alpha Gamma Delta International Fraternity, and honorary counsel for the Chinese Benevolent Association of Canada. In 2016, she was named a Distinguished Citizen by Alpha Gamma Delta.

Family
Findlay is married to actor Brent Chapman and has four children and five grandchildren.

Electoral record

References

External links
Official website

Members of the House of Commons of Canada from British Columbia
Conservative Party of Canada MPs
Women members of the House of Commons of Canada
Living people
Women in British Columbia politics
1955 births
University of British Columbia alumni
Members of the King's Privy Council for Canada
Members of the 28th Canadian Ministry
Women government ministers of Canada
Canadian Alliance candidates for the Canadian House of Commons
Canadian King's Counsel
Peter A. Allard School of Law alumni
21st-century Canadian women politicians